Miroslav Hýll (born 20 September 1973 in Žilina) is a former Slovak football goalkeeper and currently manager of FC ŠTK 1914 Šamorín. nHis former club was FC Artmedia Bratislava and previously the Slovakia national football team

Early life

Miroslav Hýll was born in Žilina, Slovakia on 20 September 1973. Before starting his career Hýll lived in his home city Žilina.

Achievements

He spent most of his football career at Inter Bratislava. At Inter he won the Slovak Cup three times, in 1995 and 2000 and then won the double (league title and the Slovak Cup) in 2001. He continued to play for  FK Inter Bratislava|Inter Bratislava until his retirement in 2009.

Post-career

In 2009, Miroslav resigned from his football career and is currently a part-time manager for Slovak football team FC ŠTK 1914 Šamorín. After his retirement in 2009 at an age of 36 Miroslav settled in Dubai, U.A.E. .

References

1973 births
Living people
Sportspeople from Žilina
Slovak footballers
Association football goalkeepers
Expatriate footballers in Iran
Slovakia international footballers
Bargh Shiraz players
Zob Ahan Esfahan F.C. players
MŠK Žilina players
FK Inter Bratislava players
FC Petržalka players
Slovak Super Liga players